Dance Emotions is the first EP by Peter Godwin. The EP was released in 1982.

Track listing
All songs written by Peter Godwin
"Emotional Disguise" (Extended Version)
"Torch Songs for the Heroine" (Extended Version)
"French Emotions"
"Images of Heaven" (Dance Mix)
"Cruel Heart"
"Luxury" (Extended Version)

References

1982 debut EPs
Peter Godwin albums